Todd Prichard (born 1974) is a Democratic member of the Iowa House of Representatives, representing the 52nd district. Prichard was first elected in a January 22, 2013 special election.

Prichard was considering running for governor in 2018, but dropped out of the race.

On June 2, 2021, Prichard announced that he would step down from his position as House Minority Leader.

Electoral history

References

External links

 Todd Prichard at Iowa Legislature
 
 Biography at Ballotpedia
 Campaign Website

|-

1974 births
21st-century American politicians
Living people
Democratic Party members of the Iowa House of Representatives
People from Charles City, Iowa
University of Iowa College of Law alumni